Last Empire - War Z: Strategy is a freemium Massively Multiplayer Online strategy game developed and published by IM30 Studios.  The game launched in August 2015.  Players take on the role of a base commander and have to establish a base to survive the zombie apocalypse.

Marketing
The game was promoted via a “Zombie Chase Parkour” video produced by parkour YouTube group Ampisound.

References

Massively multiplayer online games
2015 video games